The Masked Angel is a lost 1928 silent film romantic drama directed by Frank O'Connor and starring Betty Compson. It was produced and distributed by independent studio Chadwick Pictures.

Cast
Betty Compson - Betty
Erick Arnold - Jimmy Pruett
Wheeler Oakman - Luther Spence
Jocelyn Lee - Lola Dugan
Grace Cunard - Cactus Kate
Lincoln Plumer - Wilbur
Robert Homans - Detective Bives
Jane Keckley - Nurse

References

External links
The Masked Angel at IMDb.com

1928 films
American silent feature films
Lost American films
American romantic drama films
American black-and-white films
1928 romantic drama films
Films directed by Frank O'Connor
1920s American films
Silent romantic drama films
Silent American drama films